The Miss New Hampshire USA competition is the pageant that selects the representative for the state of New Hampshire in the Miss USA pageant. It was directed by The Clemente Organization based in Malden, Massachusetts from 2013 to 2019. GDB Theatre and Pageant Productions became the new directors for the event starting from 2020 competition.

New Hampshire has had little success at Miss USA that was not yet placed until 1962, the fifth-to-last state has made its ever placement, and has only placed five times. New Hampshire most recent placement was Camila Sacco at Miss USA 2022 after 18 years of consecutive non-placements.

Only two Miss New Hampshire USA titleholders have previously competed at Miss Teen USA, but three have competed at Miss America.

Britney Lane of Hooksett was crowned Miss New Hampshire USA 2023 on February 19, 2023, and will represent New Hampshire at Miss USA 2023.

Results summary

Placements
1st runners-up: Bridget Vezina (2000)
Top 12: Eva Dyer (1980), Camila Sacco (2022)
Top 15: Sandralee Kay (1962), Vanessa Bissanti (2004)

New Hampshire  holds a record of 5 placements at Miss USA.

Awards
Miss Congeniality: Diane Gadoury (1984)

Winners 
Color key

References

External links
 Official Website

New Hampshire
New Hampshire culture
Women in New Hampshire
Recurring events established in 1952
1952 establishments in New Hampshire
Annual events in New Hampshire